Meall Dubh (789 m) is a mountain in the Northwest Highlands, Scotland. Lying near the village of Fort Augustus, it is the highest peak between the valleys of Glen Moriston and Glen Garry.

Surrounded by moorland, a wind farm has been constructed on its slopes. The easiest route to the summit of Meall Dubh is from its northern Glen Moriston side

References

Mountains and hills of the Northwest Highlands
Marilyns of Scotland
Corbetts